The Chappel Viaduct is a railway viaduct that crosses the River Colne in the Colne Valley in Essex, England. The line previously, however, extended to Shelford in Cambridgeshire.

It was completed in 1849 by the Eastern Union Railway, which was later absorbed into the Great Eastern Railway. It was listed at Grade II in 1967.

Description

The piers consist of two shafts, separated by a  opening, joined at the top and bottom by arches. The running level of the viaduct has a gradient of 1 in 120.

Construction
The seven million bricks used in the construction of the viaduct were made from clay excavated from the nearby village of Bures. It was built to carry a double-track railway but only a single track was laid. The bridge was built by Peter Bruff between 1847 and 1849 for the Colchester, Stour Valley, Sudbury & Halstead Railway, later part of the Great Eastern Railway.

The railway initially planned to build the viaduct with laminated timber but Bruff opted for brick to reduce the cost. He debated the cost benefits of brick compared to timber with the Great Western Railway's chief engineer Isambard Kingdom Brunel after a lecture at the Institution of Civil Engineers in 1850, Brunel being strongly in favour of using timber. Bruff went on to commission a painting of the viaduct by Frederick Brett Russell, which is now held by Ipswich Museum. Sources differ on the cost of construction; E. A. Labrum gives the cost as £21,000, while Historic England state a figure of £32,000 (both 1849).

A foundation stone in pier 21 was laid by the railway company's chairman and deputy chairman at the start of works in September 1847 and newly minted coins were placed inside as a souvenir. The stone and coins disappeared within a few hours of being placed and a bricklayer was later arrested, having tried to pay at a bar with a new half sovereign, but was not convicted of the theft due to lack of evidence.

Listing

The viaduct was designated a Grade II listed structure on 27 November 1967. It is the longest bridge in East Anglia, and was reported to have been built out of 7 million bricks, making it the third-largest brick-built structure in England  after the Battersea Power Station in London, although Stockport Viaduct and Ouse Valley Viaduct used approximately 11 million bricks each.

See also
List of railway bridges and viaducts in the United Kingdom

References

External links

Bridges completed in 1849
Railway viaducts in Essex
Grade II listed buildings in Essex
Great Eastern Railway
Grade II listed bridges